Sir John Angus Nimmo  (15 January 19097 July 1997) was an Australian judge. From 1972 to 1974 he was Chief Justice of Fiji.

He attended the University of Melbourne, and while living there was a member of the Commonwealth Tax Board of Review (1947–54). He was appointed Queen's Counsel in 1957 and was an acting justice of the Supreme Court of Victoria in 1963. He was also Deputy President of the Trade Practices Tribunal (1966–73), Deputy President of the Commonwealth Conciliation and Arbitration Commission (1964–69), Chairman of the Health Insurance Committee of Inquiry (1968–69), additional Justice of the Supreme Court of the Northern Territory (1969–74), Commissioner inquiring into unlawful land subdivisions south of Darwin (1974–75), and Royal Commissioner into matters relating to Norfolk Island (1975–76).

From 1969 to 1977 he was a judge of the Australian Industrial Court, moving to the Australian Capital Territory in 1977 to become a judge of the Federal Court, a position he held until 1980.

In 1970 he was appointed Commander of the Order of the British Empire, becoming a knight bachelor in 1972, when he was appointed Chief Justice of Fiji. He was also an Officer of the Order of St John of Jerusalem.

References

1909 births
1997 deaths
Australian Commanders of the Order of the British Empire
Australian Knights Bachelor
Judges of the Federal Court of Australia
Judges of the Supreme Court of the Australian Capital Territory
Judges of the Supreme Court of the Northern Territory
Judges of the Supreme Court of Victoria
Chief justices of Fiji
Australian judges on the courts of Fiji
Judges from Melbourne
20th-century Australian lawyers
University of Melbourne alumni
Commanders of the Order of the British Empire
Officers of the Order of St John
Knights Bachelor
20th-century King's Counsel
Judges of the Commonwealth Industrial Court
20th-century Australian judges
Australian King's Counsel